Ctypansa is a genus of moths of the family Erebidae. The genus was erected by Francis Walker in 1858.

Species
Ctypansa inconstans Walker, 1858
Ctypansa obtusa Walker, 1865

References

Calpinae